Christopher White (born 11 March 1979) is a British archer who won the 2002 IFAA & 2004 FITA World Field Championships as well as the 2009 Compound event at the European Field Champions.

In 2010, he won the gold & silver medal in the team & individual compound archery event in the 2010 Commonwealth Games.

References

British male archers
1979 births
Living people
World Archery Championships medalists
Commonwealth Games medallists in archery
Commonwealth Games gold medallists for England
Commonwealth Games silver medallists for England
Archers at the 2010 Commonwealth Games
Competitors at the 2001 World Games
Competitors at the 2009 World Games
World Games bronze medalists
Medallists at the 2010 Commonwealth Games